Mortified is an Australian children's television series, co-produced by the Australian Children's Television Foundation and Enjoy Entertainment for the Nine Network Australia. The series premiered on 30 June 2006 and ended on 9 May 2007 with two seasons and a total of 26 episodes. Currently, re-runs air on both ABC and the Disney Channel, in the U.S. on Starz Kids and Family.

Premise
Mortified follows the imaginative life of Taylor Fry, a thirteen-year-old girl living in a beachside town in Australia called Sunburn Beach, as she struggles to make it through her teen years with her flawed and embarrassing family. She is embarrassed by her parents; jealous of her neighbour Brittany; her best friend, Hector, has a crush on her; and she has a crush on popular Leon. Taylor frequently breaks the fourth wall and speaks directly to the audience. Her imagination causes inanimate objects to seemingly come to life.

Cast

Main
 Marny Kennedy as Taylor Fry – Taylor is the main character and protagonist. She is embarrassed by her parents Don and Glenda, is annoyed by her sister Layla, and has a crush on her classmate Leon (while her best friend Hector has a crush on her, but she does not know it). Taylor regularly breaks the fourth wall and talks directly to the audience. Marny Kennedy received an Australian Film Institute Award for her role in Mortified.
 Nicolas Dunn as Hector Garcia – Hector is Taylor's best friend. He is a very loyal friend to Taylor, and often gets dragged along on her crusades. However, he falls out with Taylor in the episode "Flag Fall" after Taylor calls him a dork after he volunteers to raise the new school flag, and again in "School Trivia Night" where Taylor accidentally gets teamed up with Leon, but he reconciles with her twice. Hector secretly has a crush on Taylor, even going so far as to send her a Valentine's Day card in the episode "DJ Taylor" (though Taylor mistakenly assumes the card was from Leon, though even after Taylor finds out that this was not the case, Hector does not tell her the card was from him). He is allergic to cats (as revealed in the episode "Taylor Gets a Job").
 Maia Mitchell as Brittany Flune – Brittany is Taylor's next door neighbour, who sometimes has an on/off friendship with Taylor. She is beautiful and is best known for being perfect. Like Taylor with her parents Don and Glenda, Brittany is shown to sometimes feel embarrassed by her parents. She talks in flowery language and appears to be the leader of a clique in the episode "Bigger Than Vegas".
 Dajana Cahill as Layla Fry – Layla is Taylor's older sister. She is nasty and annoying, and is always getting on Taylor's nerves. She is obsessed with fashion (in the episode "Mother in the Nude", she gets a job of presenting Hipp's Apricot Hand Cream on a TV commercial and in the episode "The Chosen One", she steals Taylor's hairbrush) and is always finding and dumping boyfriends. Despite the feud between them, Layla does show some positive actions towards Taylor; such as in the episode "Taylor Gets a Job", she gives Taylor her old mobile phone (though it later turned out that all the old numbers were still in the contact list and Taylor ended up getting phone calls from random people) and in the episode "Rome Wasn't Built in a Day", she helps Taylor rebuild her half-destroyed model of a Roman kitchen after Taylor reunited her with her old boyfriend. It is revealed in the episode "Taylor Turns Bad", that Glenda considers Layla a rebel, whilst Taylor considers her to be an idiot.
 Luke Erceg as Leon Lipowski – Leon is the class heartthrob whom Taylor and Brittany both have crushes on. Hector is biased against him since Taylor has a crush on Leon (when Hector has a crush on Taylor) and when Leon always throws "missiles" at him in class, much to the annoyance of Mr. McClusky. His father, Gary, is nicknamed "Fingers" and Leon mostly enjoys surfing and sports. Leon at first appears to be an only child until his older brother, Brett, makes his first and only appearance in the episode "School Trivia Night".
 Rachel Blakely as Glenda Fry – Glenda is Taylor and Layla's mum and Don's wife. She is ditzy and wacky like Don and personality-wise, is stuck in the 1960s. She often helps Don at the Underpant King store. Like her cousin Mystic Marj, she is obsessed with things like chakras/mind/body/spirit and often meditates.
 Andrew Blackman as Don Fry – Don is the dad of Taylor and Layla, and the husband of Glenda. He is referred to as the "Underpant King" and even has a shop that sells underpants in the local shopping centre. Despite being ditzy and wacky, he does show mature effects such as the time when he rescued Taylor who was in danger of drowning since she had fallen into the sea when wearing a mermaid costume.

Recurring
 Sally McKenzie as Mystic Marj – Marj is Glenda's cousin. She is a seer/fortune teller/mystic/prophetic/psychic and makes a living out of reading tea leaves. She is eccentric and, like Glenda, has a passion for chakras. Despite her reputation, Marj is often thought to be a fraud and a bit insane. In the episode "Mother in the Nude", she and Taylor create a video where Marj predicts a series of cataclysmic events occurring at the seaside at the time of Sculpture by the Beach (e.g. rainstorms, glaciers, landslides and thunderstorms) and no one believed her, and in the episode "Bigger than Vegas", Taylor goes to ask her advice for something and Marj correctly guesses that Taylor had been nominated for school captain but only because Glenda told her.
 Steven Tandy as Mr. McClusky – Taylor, Hector, Brittany and Leon's teacher (and presumably Layla's old primary school teacher since in the episode "Taylor Turns Bad", he keeps saying her name and acts like he really knows her). He is wise and can be strict at times (especially with Leon when he throws "air-born missiles"). Mr. McClusky appears in every episode of series one (apart from "The Talk"), but is absent in series two since Taylor, Hector, Brittany and Leon depart for high school at the end of series one (though he is mentioned briefly by Taylor in the first episode of series two "Little Fish" that Taylor misses him and his bush-walking socks to which Hector replies "Seriously?").
 Peter Kent as Michael Flune and Veronica Neave as Loretta Flune – Brittany's parents. They like to keep everything "perfect". They are brilliant musicians (as revealed in the episodes "Taylor's DNA" where they play a piano solo for the talent quest and in "Mother in the Nude" where Loretta plays the piano and Michael plays the cello) and are zero-tolerant of stains (as revealed in the episode "Girl Power", when Taylor accidentally spills raspberry cordial on the carpet) and have strict house rules (as seen in the episode, "Taylor's Song.")
 David Anderson as Gary Lipowski – Leon and Brett's dad. His wife is not shown, suggesting/implying that he is widowed or divorced. He owns a repair shop for things like radios and televisions and microwaves. In the episode "School Trivia Night", he was thought briefly to have stolen the Flunes' television and donated it to the school.

Episodes

Series overview

Season 1 (2006)

Season 2 (2006–07)

Development and production
Mortified was created by screenwriter and author Angela Webber. Series director is Pino Amenta. It consists of 26 24-minute episodes. The first season of Mortified had a budget of A$9.3 million. It was shot on location in Coolangatta, Palm Beach, Burleigh Heads, Elanora and Tugun on the Gold Coast while most of the school scenes were filmed at the local Palm Beach Currumbin High School and Coolangatta State School starting on 8 June 2005, with the shopping centre scenes filmed at The Pines Shopping Centre at Elanora. Mortified was launched in Cannes at MIPTV in April 2006.

International broadcast

Crew
 Series creator: Angela Webber
 Executive producers: Phillip Bowman, Jenny Buckland, Bernadette O'Mahony, Jo Horsburgh
 Producers: Phillip Bowman, Bernadette O'Mahony
 Writers: Angela Webber, Sam Carroll, Tim Gooding, Johanna Pigott, Steve Wright, Max Dann, Chris Anastassiades, Shirley Pierce, Adam Bowen, Helen McWhirter
 Directors: Pino Amenta, Paul Moloney, Ian Gilmour, Michael Pattinson, Evan Clarry
 Script editors: Sam Carroll, Steve Wright

Awards and nominations

Home media
A DVD of the series was released in PAL format on 4 April 2007. Titled Mortified: Volume 1, the 2-disc DVD has a running time of 299 minutes and includes the first 13 episodes. Mortified: Volume 2, a 2-disc DVD consisting of episodes 14–26 (running time of 312 minutes), was released on 18 July 2007.

References

External links
 
 

Nine Network original programming
2006 Australian television series debuts
2007 Australian television series endings
Australian children's television series
Television series about teenagers
Television shows set in Queensland